Beatrice of Sicily may refer to:

 Beatrice of Sicily, Latin Empress (1252–1275), consort of Philip of Courtenay
 Beatrice of Sicily (1260–1307), daughter of Manfred of Sicily, wife of Manfred IV, Marquess of Saluzzo
 Beatrice of Sicily (1326–1365), daughter of Peter II of Sicily, wife of Rupert II of the Rhine